The Fisheries Act 1983 is an Act of Parliament in New Zealand. An important provision of the Act was establishing the Quota Management System, one of the first individual fishing quota systems. The Act was largely repealed with the passage of the Fisheries Act 1996.

See also
Fisheries Act
Fishing industry in New Zealand

References

External links
Text of the Act

Statutes of New Zealand
Fishing in New Zealand
1983 in New Zealand law
Fisheries law